Maurits Louis "Mauk" de Brauw (14 September 1925 – 12 November 1984) was a Dutch politician of the Democratic Socialists '70 (DS'70).

Decorations

References

External links

Official
  Jhr.Mr. M.L. (Mauk) de Brauw Parlement & Politiek

1925 births
1984 deaths
Democratic Socialists '70 politicians
Democrats 66 politicians
Dutch corporate directors
Dutch nonprofit directors
Dutch people of World War II
Dutch resistance members
Independent politicians in the Netherlands
Jonkheers of the Netherlands
Knights of the Order of the Netherlands Lion
Leiden University alumni
Members of the House of Representatives (Netherlands)
Ministers without portfolio of the Netherlands
Party chairs of the Netherlands
People from Leiden
Politicians from The Hague
People's Party for Freedom and Democracy politicians
Royal Netherlands Army personnel
Royal Netherlands Army personnel of World War II
20th-century Dutch businesspeople
20th-century Dutch military personnel
20th-century Dutch politicians